Pseudoleucania is a genus of moths of the family Noctuidae.

Selected species
Pseudoleucania brosii (Köhler, 1959)
Pseudoleucania diana (Butler, 1882)
Pseudoleucania ferruginescens (Blanchard, 1852)
Pseudoleucania leucaniiformis (Zerny, 1916)
Pseudoleucania luteomaculata Angulo & Olivares, 2001
Pseudoleucania marii Köhler, 1979
Pseudoleucania onerosa (Köhler, 1959)

References
Natural History Museum Lepidoptera genus database

Noctuinae